The Church of Nuestra Señora de la Asunción (Spanish: Iglesia de Nuestra Señora de la Asunción) is a Roman Catholic church located in Pinilla de Jadraque, Spain. It was declared Bien de Interés Cultural in 1965.

The parish church was built in the 12th or 13th century in a Romanesque style. Over the years, it was refurbished, and in this century, the interiors were burned.

References 

Bien de Interés Cultural landmarks in the Province of Guadalajara
Churches in Castilla–La Mancha
12th-century Roman Catholic church buildings in Spain
Romanesque architecture in Castilla–La Mancha